Primal Heart is the third studio album by New Zealand musician Kimbra. It was released on 20 April 2018 through Warner Bros. Records. It had originally been scheduled for release on 19 January 2018, but was pushed back. Kimbra released "Hi Def Distance Romance" as a free exclusive download to fans signed up to her mailing list. The album spawned 6 singles.

Critical reception

Primal Heart was positively received by music critics. At Metacritic, which assigns a normalised rating out of 100 to reviews from mainstream critics, the album has an average score of 75 based on five reviews, indicating "generally favorable reviews".

Track listing

Notes
  signifies a co-producer
  signifies an additional producer

Charts

References

2018 albums
Kimbra albums
Warner Records albums
Albums produced by John Congleton